The Klimov TV7-117 is a Russian turboprop engine certified in 1997 to power the Ilyushin Il-114 regional commuter aircraft. The new engine features enhanced reliability, fuel economy and greater service life compared to its predecessors produced in the former Soviet Union. The engine has a modular design. The nine modules can be replaced in the field, which dramatically reduces costs and accelerates repair and maintenance. The engine has an electronic-hydromechanical control system.

The TV7-117S engine has been offered to power the newest Russian turboprop aircraft such as Ilyushin Il-112 and Ilyushin Il-114. In addition, Klimov developed the TV7-117V turboshaft to power rotary-wing aircraft, such as the Mil Mi-38, and marine drives for high-speed boats and industrial electric power plants. The TV7-117 engine family is produced by Klimov JSC (St. Petersburg), Chernishov JSC (Moscow) and the Baranov JSC (Omsk) and Aerosila propellers for TV7-117S variants.

Variants

 TV7-117S 2800 hp
 TV7-117SM/ST (the S stands for the Russian word for aircraft, the M for airliner, as opposed to military cargo aircraft,  which are designated ST, with the T being for transport) is the turboprop variant for fixed wing aircraft, that was introduced by Klimov in 2002, featuring a Full Authority Digital Electric Control (FADEC) system based on the BARK-12 or BARK-57 electronic engine control unit, as well as improved reliability, manufacturability and maintainability. It features an enclosed centrifugal wheel that increases its power by 10% while maintaining all the other performance parameters. The Klimov Company holds a patent for the design and manufacturing of such wheels. This engine is used on the Ilyushin Il-114 and is likely to be used on the new Ilyushin Il-112. The TV7-117ST-01 used in the Il-114-300 has a take off power of up to 3,100 hp.
TV7-117V/VM (the V stands for the Russian word for helicopter) is the turboshaft variant for helicopters, a model with the powershaft in front dedicated to the new Mi-38 (VK-3000 family).
TV7-117VK is a version with the powershaft in the rear to upgrade Mi-28 and Ka-50/Ka-52 helicopters (VK-3000 family).

Applications
 Ilyushin Il-112
 Ilyushin Il-114
 Mil Mi-38

Specifications (TV7-117VM)

See also

References
Notes

External links

 Airplane version on the manufacturer's website
 Helicopter version on the manufacturer's website
 TV7-117 turboprop engines by V.Ya.Klimov

TV7-117
1990s turboprop engines
1990s turboshaft engines